The New Jersey Republican Party (NJGOP) is the affiliate of the United States Republican Party in New Jersey. It was founded in 1880 and is currently led by Bob Hugin.

Current leadership

 Bob Hugin, Chairman
 Darlene Shotmeyer, Vice Chairwoman
 Irene Kim Asbury, Secretary
 Shaun Van Doren, Treasurer
 Bill Palatucci, National Committeeman
 Virginia Haines, National Committeewoman
 Christine Giordano Hanlon, Strategic Advisor to the Chairman
 Tom Szymanski, Executive Director
 Madi Holmes,  Finance & Events Director
 Alexandra Wilkes, Communications Director
 Luke Ferrante, Political Director

Current elected officials
The New Jersey Republican Party holds a minority in both the New Jersey General Assembly and the New Jersey Senate.

Members of Congress

U.S. Senate
None

Both of New Jersey's U.S. Senate seats have held by Democrats since 2013. Clifford P. Case was the last Republican elected to represent New Jersey in the U.S. Senate in 1972. Case served four consecutive terms before losing the Republican primary in 1978 to Jeff Bell, who himself lost the General election to Democratic challenger Bill Bradley. Two Republicans have served interim appointments to the Senate since: Nicholas F. Brady and Jeffrey Chiesa. Neither ran for election to a full term.

U.S. House of Representatives
Out of the 12 seats New Jersey is apportioned in the U.S. House of Representatives, three are held by Republicans:

State officials

New Jersey Senate
Senate Minority Leader: Steve Oroho of Franklin (Sussex)

New Jersey Assembly
Assembly Minority Leader: John DiMaio of Hackettstown

Past elected officials

Vice President of the United States
Garret Hobart (1897–99)

U.S. senators

U.S. representatives

1856–1874

1875–1899

1900–1924

1925–1949

1950–1974

1975–present

Governors

Party chairmen

See also
Republican Party (United States)
New Jersey
New Jersey Democratic State Committee

References

External links
New Jersey Republican State Committee

1880 establishments in New Jersey
Political parties established in 1880
 
Republican State Committee
New Jersey